George Kenneth Mallory (February 14, 1900 – April 8, 1986) was an American pathologist chiefly remembered for describing the Mallory–Weiss tear.

He was born in Boston, Massachusetts on 14 February 1900, the son of Frank Burr Mallory. He received his medical degree from Harvard Medical School in 1926, and subsequently worked at the Mallory Institute of Pathology (founded by, and named after, his father) at Boston City Hospital throughout his career, becoming director in 1951. He lectured at both Harvard Medical School and Boston Medical School. He was appointed a professor at Boston Medical School in 1948, and he became an emeritus professor in 1966. His primary interest was diseases of the liver and kidneys.

In 1929 Mallory and Soma Weiss, a physician at Harvard, described 15 cases of severe, painless hemorrhage caused by a tear in the mucosa of the esophagus or gastroesophageal junction preceded by vomiting in alcoholic patients. They described a further 6 cases in 1932. This syndrome has become known as Mallory–Weiss syndrome.

References

1900 births
1986 deaths
American pathologists
Harvard Medical School alumni
20th-century American physicians